Holywell Community Hospital is a community hospital in Halkyn Road, Holywell, Flintshire, Wales. It is managed by the Betsi Cadwaladr University Health Board.

History
The hospital was commissioned to replace both the old Holywell Cottage Hospital, which had been established in Pen-Y-Maes Road in 1909, as well as the old Lluesty Hospital, which had been established on the Old Chester Road in 1840. The new facility, which was designed by TACP Architects and built at a cost of £8.3 million, opened in March 2008.

References

External links 
 
 Healthcare Inspectorate Wales inspection reports

Betsi Cadwaladr University Health Board
NHS hospitals in Wales
Hospitals established in 2008
Hospital buildings completed in 2008
Hospitals in Flintshire